Damiana Deiana  (born 26 June 1970) is an Italian footballer who played as a defender for the Italy women's national football team. She was part of the team at the 1999 FIFA Women's World Cup.

References

External links
 

1970 births
Living people
Italian women's footballers
Italy women's international footballers
Place of birth missing (living people)
1999 FIFA Women's World Cup players
Women's association football defenders
Torres Calcio Femminile players
ASD Fiammamonza 1970 players
Roma Calcio Femminile players
Torino Women A.S.D. players
People from Sassari
Footballers from Sardinia
Sardinian women